The Kedukan Bukit inscription is an inscription discovered by the Dutchman C.J. Batenburg on 29 November 1920 at Kedukan Bukit, South Sumatra, Dutch East Indies (now Indonesia), on the banks of Tatang River, a tributary of Musi River. It is the oldest surviving specimen of the Malay language, in a form known as Old Malay. This inscription is dated 1 May 683 CE. This inscription was written in  Tamil Pallava script.

Content

Transliteration

Modern Common Malay translation

Indonesian translation

English translation

See also

 Telaga Batu inscription
 Kota Kapur Inscription
 Talang Tuwo inscription
 Laguna Copperplate Inscription
 History of Indonesia
 Timeline of Indonesian history

Notes

Further reading
 George Coedès, Les inscriptions malaises de Çrivijaya, BEFEO 1930
 J.G. de Casparis, Indonesian Palaeography, Leiden (Brill) 1975.
 Safiah Karim, Tatabahasa Dewan Edisi Baharu, Dewan Bahasa dan Pustaka 1993.

683 establishments
Malay inscriptions
Inscriptions in Indonesia
7th-century inscriptions
History of Sumatra
Srivijaya
Earliest known manuscripts by language